Hannah Kane is a State Representative who represents the 11th Worcester District in the Massachusetts House of Representatives. She represents the towns of Shrewsbury and Westborough. Kane serves as the Ranking Minority on the Joint Committee on Cannabis Policy and the Joint Committee on Public Health, and as a member on the House Committee on Ways and Means, and the Joint Committee on Ways and Means. She also serves as a Shrewsbury Town Meeting Member, and as president of the Shrewsbury Public Schools Foundation.

Career 
Kane graduated from Boston University's Questrom School of Business in 1993. She owns Beaton Kane Construction with her predecessor in the House, Matt Beaton. She previously worked at the insurance company Unum, and at the quasi-public state agency MassDevelopment, where she was the director of marketing and product development. Upon her return to the private sector, Kane worked in the field of consulting.

Personal life 
She is married to James Kane, the chairman of the Shrewsbury Board of Selectman, and has three children. 
Kane resides in Shrewsbury.

See also
 2019–2020 Massachusetts legislature
 2021–2022 Massachusetts legislature

References

Living people
21st-century American women politicians
21st-century American politicians
Women state legislators in Massachusetts
Republican Party members of the Massachusetts House of Representatives
Boston University School of Management alumni
People from Shrewsbury, Massachusetts
1971 births